Potassium azodicarboxylate is chemical compound that used as a precursor to diimide. It can be synthesized by the reaction of potassium hydroxide with azodicarbonamide and it reacts with carboxylic acids to form diimide.

References 

Potassium compounds
Azo compounds
Reagents for organic chemistry